Ryan George Blake (born 8 December 1991) is an English former professional footballer who played as a left back in the Football League for Brentford. He was capped by Northern Ireland at youth level.

Career

Brentford 
A left back, Blake began his career with League One club Brentford and signed a scholarship deal during the 2008 off-season. He was an unused substitute on 19 occasions throughout the 2009–10 season and made his debut in a 1–1 draw with Yeovil Town on 24 April 2010, when he replaced Lionel Ainsworth after an hour.

Despite signing his first professional contract during the 2010 off-season, Blake found his first team chances limited during the 2010–11 season and was an unused substitute on just four occasions. He was loaned to Conference South clubs Woking and Ebbsfleet United during the season and made 16 appearances across both spells.

Blake signed new a one-year contract to be part of the Development Squad for the 2011–12 season and spent much of the season out on loan at Conference South clubs Farnborough and Hampton & Richmond Borough. He failed to feature at all for the first team under new manager Uwe Rösler during the season and was released when his contract expired in June 2012.

Return to Ebbsfleet United 
Following an unsuccessful trial with Lincoln City, Blake returned to Conference Premier club Ebbsfleet United on a permanent contract during the 2012 off-season. He made only eight appearances during his only full season with the club, as Ebbsfleet suffered relegation to the Conference South.

Chertsey Town 
Blake signed for Southern League First Division Central club Chertsey Town in August 2013 and was awarded the captaincy. He departed the club at the end of the 2013–14 season.

Kingstonian 
Blake joined Isthmian League Premier Division club Kingstonian during the 2014 off-season. He made 8 appearances, with his final match coming in early December 2014.

International career 
Blake was capped by Northern Ireland at U19 and U21 level. He made his U19 debut in a 2–2 2010 European U19 championship elite qualifying draw with Russia on 23 May 2010, coming on as a 41st-minute substitute for Dean Jarvis. Blake made his U21 debut on 3 September 2010, coming on as an 86th-minute substitute for Paddy McLaughlin in a 4–0 2011 European U21 Championship qualifying victory over San Marino. He made his second U21 appearance in a friendly against Wales on 9 February 2011, starting the match and playing an hour before being substituted.

Career statistics

References

External links
 
 Ryan Blake at Northern Ireland's Football Greats
 

1991 births
Living people
People from Weybridge
Brentford F.C. players
Woking F.C. players
Ebbsfleet United F.C. players
Farnborough F.C. players
Hampton & Richmond Borough F.C. players
English Football League players
National League (English football) players
Northern Ireland under-21 international footballers
Northern Ireland youth international footballers
Southern Football League players
Chertsey Town F.C. players
Association football fullbacks
English people of Northern Ireland descent
Kingstonian F.C. players
English footballers